The All Ireland Schoolboys Hockey Championship is an annual competition involving the strongest schools affiliated to Hockey Ireland. The competition is held in the Autumn term of each school year.

Banbridge Academy, Down, are the current champions, having defeated The High School, Dublin in the 2022 final in The Maradyke, Cork

Venues 

The venue of the competition is on a three-year rota between
Munster
Leinster 
and
Ulster

History 

The competition began in the 1982 school year. It was initially dominated by schools from Ulster, with the first fourteen winners coming from that province. The monopoly was finally broken in 1996-97 15th tournament, when Newpark School from Dublin became the first winners from Leinster.
Ashton were the first school from Munster to win the All Ireland tournament. 
In 2019 all four semifinalists hailed from Leinster, with eventual winners, The High School, defeating King’s Hospital 1-0 to reach their first ever final. The same scoreline stood in the other semi, where Wesley College were beaten by tournament runners-up St. Andrew’s College.

Format 

Sixteen teams compete in the finals. The teams are drawn into four pools with four teams each. Each team plays the other three teams in their group once. Each group winner then play one of the other group winners in a semi-final match. The two semi-final winners then play each other in the final. The winner of the final is presented with the Tasmanian Shield.

Performance table

Finals

1982-1988

1989-1998

1999-2008

2009-

2020-

Sources

External links  
 Irish Hockey Association website 
 

Field hockey competitions in Ireland
1982 establishments in Ireland